Anem or Anim was a Levitical city in Israel allocated to the Gershonites, according to the Hebrew Bible, from the land of the tribe of Issachar (6:58 in some Bibles). In the parallel location in the Book of Joshua, the name En-gannim or Engannim appears, and the two names may refer to the same town.

The location of Anem is unknown.

William F. Albright suggested that Anem was the same location as En-gannim, the two spellings being variants of a single original site ʕen-ʕonam. But Hagen Martino (in 1907), claimed that Anem is 'probably a distinct site', near En-gannim.

See also
For the two locations named En-gannim, one of which may be the same location as Anem, see List of minor biblical places#En-gannim

References

Levitical cities